Darkie Ellis (born Cyril Hills; 15 December 1914 – 14 December 1946) was a British professional boxer, from 1931 to 1940. He was the son of William Hills and Elizabeth Farnsworth. His birth was registered in the December quarter of 1914.

He was at various times a welterweight; middleweight and light-heavyweight, and fought in 91 professional bouts. He was promoted as "middleweight champion of England". He represented England at a tournament in Antwerp, Belgium on 21 March 1939.

He served in the military in the Second World War.

Ellis, who was black, married a white woman from Bridlington, East Riding of Yorkshire, Joyce, and retired there. They had two daughters. He died in his early thirties. His wife later remarried.

A collection of Ellis memorabilia, owned by his grand-daughter, was shown on the BBC programme Antiques Roadshow in December 2008.

References 

English male boxers
Welterweight boxers
Middleweight boxers
Light-heavyweight boxers
People from Bridlington
British Army personnel of World War II
1914 births
1946 deaths
Black British sportspeople